Quintus Vibius Secundus was a Roman Senator who was active during the reigns of Domitian and Trajan. He was suffect consul for the nundinium of March to April 86.

A member of the gens Vibia, Secundus is considered to be the son of the influential Politician Lucius Junius Quintus Vibius Crispus. There is a possibility that Secundus could be related to suffect consul Lucius Vibius Sabinus, father of the Empress Vibia Sabina.

Only one office is known for Secundus: in 101/102 the sortition selected him as proconsular governor of Asia.

References

Further reading
Julian Bennett, Trajan: Optimus Princeps : a Life and Times (London: Routledge, 1997) , 

1st-century Romans
2nd-century Romans
Secundus
Suffect consuls of Imperial Rome
Roman governors of Asia